Unmechanical is a 2.5D puzzle video game developed by now defunct Swedish studio Talawa Games and published by Teotl Studios. It was released in 2012 for Windows. It was later available for iOS. It is available on Steam, GOG.com, GamersGate, OnLive, Rain, Desura and on the App Store. Unmechanical: Extended is an extended edition of the original game, developed by Czech developer Grip Games. It features new levels and bonuses. It was also released for PlayStation 3, PlayStation 4, and Xbox One in 2015.

Gameplay 

Unmechanical features puzzle solving and exploration. The game began as a student project. Unmechanical focuses on accessible controls that make it easy, and challenges the player with a wide array of puzzles.

Reception 

The iOS and PlayStation 4 versions of Unmechanical received "generally favourable reviews", while the PC and Xbox One versions received "average" reviews, according to the review aggregation website Metacritic.  In Japan, where the PS3 and PS4 versions were ported for release and published by Cross Function on October 21, 2015, followed by the Xbox One version on December 21, 2015, Famitsu gave the PS4 version a score of one eight, one seven, one eight, and one seven for a total of 30 out of 40.

References

External links 

 
 
 

2012 video games
IOS games
Linux games
MacOS games
PlayStation 3 games
PlayStation 4 games
PlayStation Network games
PlayStation Vita games
Puzzle video games
Single-player video games
Unreal Engine games
Video games developed in Sweden
Windows games
Xbox One games

Video games about robots
Grip Digital games